Latif Yalınlı (1906 – 5 February 1965) was a Turkish footballer. He played in three matches for the Turkey national football team from 1927 to 1928. He was also part of Turkey's squad for the football tournament at the 1928 Summer Olympics, but he did not play in any matches.

References

External links
 

1906 births
1965 deaths
Turkish footballers
Turkey international footballers
Place of birth missing
Association football forwards
Olympic footballers of Turkey
Footballers at the 1928 Summer Olympics
Galatasaray S.K. footballers